The order of precedence for public ceremonies in France is established by  (Decree no. 89–655 of 13 September 1989 relating to public ceremonies, precedence, and civil and military honours). The original order has been modified since 1989, for example inserting the Defender of Rights after that office's 2011 creation.  the order is as follows:

The President of the Republic (Emmanuel Macron)
The Prime Minister (Élisabeth Borne)
The President of the Senate (Gérard Larcher)
The President of the National Assembly (Yaël Braun-Pivet)
Former Presidents of the Republic, in order of term
Nicolas Sarkozy
François Hollande
The Government, in the order decided by the President of the Republic (Borne government)
Former Prime Ministers, in order of term
Laurent Fabius
Édith Cresson
Édouard Balladur
Alain Juppé
Lionel Jospin
Jean-Pierre Raffarin
Dominique de Villepin
François Fillon
Jean-Marc Ayrault
Manuel Valls
Bernard Cazeneuve
Édouard Philippe
Jean Castex
The President of the Constitutional Council (Laurent Fabius, who ranks higher as former Prime Minister)
The Vice President of the Conseil d'État (Didier-Roland Tabuteau)
The President of the Economic, Social and Environmental Council (Thierry Beaudet)
The Defender of Rights (Claire Hédon)
Members of the National Assembly
Senators
European parliament members
The judicial authority represented by the first President of the Court of Cassation (Chantal Arens) and the public prosecutor of that court (François Molins)
The first President of the Revenue Court (Cour des Comptes) (Pierre Moscovici) and the public prosecutor of that court
The Great Chancellor of the Légion d'honneur, chancellor of the National Order of Merit (Général Benoît Puga) and the members of the councils of these orders
The Chancellor of the Order of the Libération, and the members of the council of this order
The Chief of the Defence Staff (Général Thierry Burkhard)

The following then apply in Paris:
The prefect of the Île-de-France région, prefect of Paris (Michel Delpuech)
The prefect of police, prefect of the Paris defense zone (Michel Delpuech)
The mayor of Paris, president of the Council of Paris (Anne Hidalgo)
The representatives to the European Parliament
The chancellor of the Institute of France, the perpetual secretaries of the French Academy, the Académie des inscriptions et belles-lettres, the Academy of Sciences, of the Académie des beaux-arts and of the academy of moral and political sciences
The general secretary of the government; the general secretary of national defence; the general secretary of the Ministry of foreign affairs
The president of the administrative court of appeal of Paris (Patrick Frydman); the first president of the Paris court of appeal (Jacques Degrandi) and the general public prosecutor of that court (François Falletti)
The general delegate for weaponry; the general secretary for administration of the Ministry of defence; the chief of staff of the army; the chief of staff of the navy; the chief of staff of the air force; the military governor of Paris, commanding the Île-de-France army region
The president of the high council of broadcasting (CSA) (Olivier Schrameck)
The president of the national commission "computing and freedoms" (CNIL) (Marie-Laure Denis)
The president of the concurrence council
Universities of Paris

There are analogous orderings for local officials at events in Metropolitan France outside Paris, for Overseas France, and on naval bases. There are also provisions to allow subordinate to take the place of certain head officers, if absent. For events organised by a public body other than the national government, the body's head ranks second after the representative of the State (President, prefect, or sub-prefect).

References 
 

France
Politics of France